Christian Pierce Gaddi Luanzon (born January 22, 1983) is a retired Filipino-American professional basketball player in the Philippine Basketball Association who last played for the San Miguel Beermen.

He is part of the broadcast panel of the UAAP men's basketball for ABS-CBN Sports. He also played for the Malacañan-PSC Kamao in the UNTV Cup.

Collegiate career
Although born in the United States, Luanzon grew up in the Philippines played in St. Stephen's High School in Manila and played collegiate ball at the University of Santo Tomas (UST). He was named into the First-Team All-UAAP First Team honors in the 2003-2004 season. In his last year in the UAAP he averaged a team high 15 points, 9.2 rebounds and 6.7 Assists.

PBA career
Prior the 2006 draft, this 6'4 draft volunteered to have a workout with the Aces and coach Tim Cone was impressed with the intensity and work ethic of this former University of Santo Tomas stalwart. During his days with the Growling Tigers, Luanzon had shown abilities to hit the jumpers, defend the wing players and finish the fast breaks.

Tabbed No. 18 overall in the 2006 PBA Draft, Luanzon's ability to defend the quicker players and hit the perimeter opens an opportunity for him to reach the big league. He played for Harbour Center in the PBL where he only suited up for four games. And the youngster knows that his role will be limited with the Aces but will be ready when given the opportunity.

He was a member of the Alaska Aces when they won the 2007 PBA Fiesta Conference championship.

He last played in the PBL-Liga Merger for the ANI-FCA Cultivators Team.

Coaching career 
Beginning in 2022, Luanzon became one of the assistant coaches for the UP Fighting Maroons. In Season 84, the Maroons won the championship.

Awards
Philippine Basketball League Rookie of the Year (2002)

References

External links
Official Website 

1983 births
Living people
Alaska Aces (PBA) players
Filipino men's basketball players
Filipino television sportscasters
Power forwards (basketball)
Basketball players from San Jose, California
UST Growling Tigers basketball players
Alaska Aces (PBA) draft picks
American men's basketball players
Citizens of the Philippines through descent
UP Fighting Maroons basketball coaches